The 2018 Unibet World Grand Prix was the 21st staging of the World Grand Prix. It was held from 30 September–6 October 2018 at the Citywest Hotel in Dublin, Ireland.

The defending champion Daryl Gurney lost to Michael van Gerwen 1–4 in the semi-finals.

Notably during the tournament, Dave Chisnall hit the highest ever losing average in a World Grand Prix match, when he averaged 97.78 in his 3–1 defeat in the quarter-finals to Michael van Gerwen.

Van Gerwen went on to lift his fourth World Grand Prix title, defeating Peter Wright 5–2 in the final.

Prize money
The total prize money remained at £400,000. The following is the breakdown of the fund:

Qualification
The field of 32 players was made up from the top 16 on the PDC Order of Merit and the top 16 non-qualified players from the ProTour Order of Merit. The top eight players were seeded in the tournament. The following players qualified for the tournament:

PDC Order of Merit (1–16) (Top 8 seeded)
  Michael van Gerwen (champion)
  Peter Wright (runner-up)
  Rob Cross (first round)
  Gary Anderson (quarter-finals)
  Daryl Gurney (semi-finals)
  Mensur Suljović (semi-finals)
  Simon Whitlock (first round)
  Dave Chisnall (quarter-finals)
  Michael Smith (first round)
  James Wade (first round)
  Ian White (second round)
  Gerwyn Price (quarter-finals)
  Raymond van Barneveld (second round)
  Darren Webster (second round)
  Joe Cullen (first round)
  Adrian Lewis (second round)

Pro Tour
  Jonny Clayton (first round)
  James Wilson (quarter-finals)
  Stephen Bunting (first round)
  Max Hopp (first round)
  Mervyn King (first round)
  Steve West (first round)
  Jermaine Wattimena (second round)
  Kim Huybrechts (first round)
  John Henderson (first round)
  Steve Beaton (second round)
  Steve Lennon (first round)
  Danny Noppert (first round)
  Ricky Evans (first round)
  Josh Payne (first round)
  Jeffrey de Zwaan (second round)
  Ron Meulenkamp (second round)

Draw

References

External links
Tournament website

World Grand Prix (darts)
World Grand Prix
World Grand Prix (darts)
International sports competitions in Dublin (city)
World Grand Prix
World Grand Prix (darts)
World Grand Prix (darts), 2018